Sala is a surname and given name with several origins. First, in Italian, Catalan, Portuguese, Spanish, Occitan, and Romanian, a topographic or occupational name meaning someone living in or employed at a hall or manor. Second, in Hungarian, a short for the Biblical name Solomon. Third, a variant of the name Salah.  Notable people named Sala include:

Surname

Arts and entertainment

Musicians
 Alessandro Sala (composer) (1816–1890), Italian composer, organist, and pianist
 Flavio Sala (born 1983), Italian Classical guitar player
 Ingrid Sala Santamaria (born 1940), Filipina pianist
 Nicola Sala (1713–1801), Italian composer
 Oskar Sala (1910–2002), German composer
 Pep Sala (born 1960), Catalan musician, songwriter and record producer

Other arts
 Anri Sala (born 1974), Albanian artist
 Emilio Sala (painter) (1850–1910), Spanish painter
 Emilio Sala (sculptor) (1864–1920), Italian sculptor
 Emilio Grau Sala (1911–1975), Catalan painter
 Richard Sala (1954–2020), American cartoonist, illustrator and comic book creator

Athletes
 Albert Sala (born 1981), Spanish field hockey player
 Andrea Sala (footballer) (born 1993), Italian footballer
 Carlos Sala (born 1960), retired Spanish hurdler
 Claudio Sala (born 1947), former Italian association football player and current commentator
 Costantino Sala (1913–?), Italian professional football player
 Darío Sala (born 1974), Argentine football goalkeeper
 Emiliano Sala (1990–2019), Argentine football forward
 Giovanni Sala (born 1963), Italian enduro rider and a six-time World Enduro Champion
 Guido Sala (1928–1987), Italian Grand Prix motorcycle road racer and world champion kart racer
 Lee Sala (born 1926–2012), American contender for the middleweight boxing crown in the 1940s and 1950s
 Luigi Sala (born 1974), Italian football defender
 Luis Pérez-Sala (born 1959), Catalan-Spanish racing driver
 Manuel Sala (born 1982), Angolan football player
 Marco Sala (footballer, born 1886) (1886–1969), Italian professional footballer, who played as a defender
 Marco Sala (footballer, born 1999), Italian football defender
 Patrizio Sala (born 1955), Italian former footballer
 Ramón Sala (born 1971), Spanish field hockey defender
 Valentino Sala (1908–?), Italian football player and coach

Politics 

 Giuseppe Sala (born 1958), Italian politician
 Michel Sala (born 1954) is an Algerian-born French trade unionist and politician
 Milagro Sala (born 1964), leader of the Tupac Amaru neighborhood association, Argentina
 Ricardo Sala Gaitán (fl. 1992–1996), Colombian industrial engineer and politician

Others
 Alessandra Sala, Italian computer scientist
 André Ricard Sala (born 1929), Catalan industrial designer
 Enric Sala (born 1968), marine ecologist and an Explorer-in-Residence at National Geographic
 Galdino della Sala (1096–1176), tenth century Christian saint from Milan, Italy
 George Augustus Sala (1828–1895), British journalist
 Jean Sala Breitenstein (1900–1986), United States federal judge
 Louis Sala-Molins (born 1935), essayist and political philosophy professor at Paris-I and Toulouse-II universities
 Luc Sala (born 1949), Dutch entrepreneur and writer
 Oscar Sala (1922–2010), Italian-Brazilian nuclear physicist
 Xavier Sala-i-Martin (born 1963), Spanish academic economist

Given name
 Sala Baker (born 1976), New Zealand actor and stuntman
 Sala Burton (1925–1987), United States Representative from California
 Sala Fa'alogo (born 1977), New Zealand rugby league player
 Sala, folk hero who killed a tiger; see Hoysala Empire#History

References